Gorki is a rural locality (a selo) in Krasnoselskoye Rural Settlement, Yuryev-Polsky District, Vladimir Oblast, Russia. The population was 491 as of 2010. There are 9 streets.

Geography 
Gorki is located on the Kist River, 22 km northwest of Yuryev-Polsky (the district's administrative centre) by road. Vypolzovo is the nearest rural locality.

References 

Rural localities in Yuryev-Polsky District